Amanda Joy Michalka (born April 10, 1991) is an American actress, musician and  singer-songwriter who is best known as one half of the musical duo Aly & AJ (briefly 78violet), alongside her older sister Aly Michalka. She has appeared in films such as The Lovely Bones (2008), Secretariat (2010), Super 8 (2011), Grace Unplugged (2013), Weepah Way for Now (2015), and Support the Girls (2018). Michalka also starred in the ABC sitcom The Goldbergs (2013–2023) and its spin-off series Schooled (2019–2020). She is also known for voicing a lead role as Catra in the Netflix animated adventure series She-Ra and the Princesses of Power (2018–2020).

Early life
Michalka was born in Torrance, California and is the younger sister of actress and musician Aly Michalka. Her father, Mark, owns a contracting company, and her mother, Carrie, is a musician and performed with the Christian rock band "JC Band". Her parents are divorced. As a little girl, she briefly lived in Seattle and Milwaukee. Both she and her sister attended Mack Elementary. She has played the piano since she was six and started playing the guitar in her early life. She started acting when she was five, mostly in church play productions. She was raised as a Christian and homeschooled for part of her childhood. Michalka was in a number of musical productions at her school in Milwaukee as a young woman.

Career

She plays a variety of instruments such as acoustic guitar, electric guitar, and piano. She was a model for catalogs. In 2006 she made her Disney Channel debut in the Disney Channel Original Movie Cow Belles, as "Courtney Callum", along with sister Aly, as "Taylor Callum". She has also appeared on shows such as Oliver Beene, Six Feet Under, The Guardian, and General Hospital. She and her sister appeared in the MTV film Super Sweet 16: The Movie.

In 2009 she was featured in the Peter Jackson film The Lovely Bones, released widely on January 15, 2010.

From 2009 to 2013 Michalka and her sister performed as the musical duo 78violet. They decided to change its name back to "Aly and AJ" in 2015. She was cast as a recurring character on The CW series Hellcats starring Ashley Tisdale and her sister Aly Michalka. The series ran for one season and was cancelled in May 2011.

Michalka appeared in the 2011 film Super 8, directed by J. J. Abrams. Her first big-screen starring role was as the title character in 2013's Grace Unplugged.

Since 2013, Michalka has had a recurring role on the ABC sitcom The Goldbergs as Lainey Lewis, the best friend of main character Erica Goldberg and one-time girlfriend of Erica's brother, Barry. In May 2015, it was announced that she was promoted to series regular for the show's upcoming third season. She also played the Lainey character in a lead role on the spinoff series Schooled, which ran for two seasons.

Michalka voices the character Stevonnie in Steven Universe, a fusion of the protagonist Steven and his best friend Connie. In July 2014, she and her sister filmed an untitled drama in Laurel Canyon, California. The film was directed and written by Aly's husband, Stephen Ringer. Michalka was one of the producers of the film, with her sister and Ringer, and participated in the casting process. In May 2015, it was announced that the film, Weepah Way for Now, would premiere at the Los Angeles Film Festival on June 16, 2015. The film was released on DVD, iTunes, and other streaming platforms in June 2016.

Filmography

Film

Television

Music videos

Discography

Awards and nominations

References

External links

 

1991 births
Living people
Actors from Torrance, California
Actresses from California
Actresses from Seattle
Aly & AJ
American child actresses
American child singers
American women pop singers
American women singer-songwriters
American film actresses
American performers of Christian music
American television actresses
American women guitarists
Guitarists from California
Guitarists from Washington (state)
Hollywood Records artists
Musicians from Seattle
Musicians from Torrance, California
Singer-songwriters from California
21st-century American actresses
21st-century American singers
21st-century American women singers
Singer-songwriters from Washington (state)